The 6-demicubic honeycomb or demihexeractic honeycomb is a uniform space-filling tessellation (or honeycomb) in Euclidean 6-space. It is constructed as an alternation of the regular 6-cube honeycomb.

It is composed of two different types of facets. The 6-cubes become alternated into 6-demicubes h{4,3,3,3,3} and the alternated vertices create 6-orthoplex {3,3,3,3,4} facets.

D6 lattice 
The vertex arrangement of the 6-demicubic honeycomb is the D6 lattice. The 60 vertices of the rectified 6-orthoplex vertex figure of the 6-demicubic honeycomb reflect the kissing number 60 of this lattice. The best known is 72, from the E6 lattice and the 222 honeycomb.

The D lattice (also called D) can be constructed by the union of two D6 lattices. This packing is only a lattice for even dimensions. The kissing number is 25=32 (2n-1 for n<8, 240 for n=8, and 2n(n-1) for n>8).
 ∪ 

The D lattice (also called D and C) can be constructed by the union of all four 6-demicubic lattices: It is also the 6-dimensional body centered cubic, the union of two 6-cube honeycombs in dual positions.
 ∪  ∪  ∪  =  ∪ .

The kissing number of the D6* lattice is 12 (2n for n≥5). and its Voronoi tessellation is a trirectified 6-cubic honeycomb, containing all birectified 6-orthoplex Voronoi cell, .

Symmetry constructions 

There are three uniform construction symmetries of this tessellation. Each symmetry can be represented by arrangements of different colors on the 64 6-demicube facets around each vertex.

Related honeycombs

See also 
6-cubic honeycomb

Notes

External links 
 Kaleidoscopes: Selected Writings of H. S. M. Coxeter, edited by F. Arthur Sherk, Peter McMullen, Anthony C. Thompson, Asia Ivic Weiss, Wiley-Interscience Publication, 1995,  
 (Paper 24) H.S.M. Coxeter, Regular and Semi-Regular Polytopes III, [Math. Zeit. 200 (1988) 3-45]
 

Honeycombs (geometry)
7-polytopes